Kristina Nedopekina (born 1989) is a handball player from Kazakhstan. She played on the Kazakhstan women's national handball team, and participated at the 2011 World Women's Handball Championship in Brazil.

References

1989 births
Living people
Kazakhstani female handball players
Handball players at the 2010 Asian Games
Asian Games competitors for Kazakhstan
20th-century Kazakhstani women
21st-century Kazakhstani women